The 1909 Tasmanian state election was held on 30 April 1909. This election saw the introduction of proportional representation in Tasmanian elections.

Retiring Members

Anti-Socialist
Charles Allen
Stafford Bird
William Brownell
Charles Mackenzie
Christopher O'Reilly
Alfred Youl

Liberal Democrats
Sir John McCall
George Brettingham-Moore
Herbert Nicholls

House of Assembly
Sitting members are shown in bold text. Tickets that elected at least one MHA are highlighted in the relevant colour. Successful candidates are indicated by an asterisk (*).

Bass
Six seats were up for election.

Darwin
Six seats were up for election.

Denison
Six seats were up for election.

Franklin
Six seats were up for election.

Wilmot
Six seats were up for election.

See also
 Members of the Tasmanian House of Assembly, 1906–1909
 Members of the Tasmanian House of Assembly, 1909–1912

References
Tasmanian Parliamentary Library

Candidates for Tasmanian state elections